= Filkin Hill =

Mountain in New York state

- Location within New York Adirondack Park Location within the United States

Highest point
- Elevation: 1,804 feet (550 m)
- Coordinates: 42°36′00″N 74°04′53″W

Geography
- Location: ENE of Huntersland, New York, U.S.
- Topo map: USGS Westerlo

Filkin Hill is a mountain in Albany County, New York. It is located east-northeast of Huntersland. East Hill is located west, Wolf Hill is located east-southeast, Cole Hill is located west, and Irish Hill is located west of Filkin Hill.
